The Jefferson Public Library building is located in Jefferson, Wisconsin.

History
The library was a Carnegie library. Currently, the building is used by the Council for Performing Arts for offices. It was listed on the National Register of Historic Places in 1980 and on the State Register of Historic Places in 1989.

References

Libraries on the National Register of Historic Places in Wisconsin
Office buildings on the National Register of Historic Places in Wisconsin
National Register of Historic Places in Jefferson County, Wisconsin
Carnegie libraries in Wisconsin
Prairie School architecture in Wisconsin
Brick buildings and structures
Library buildings completed in 1911